Colin James (born Colin James Munn, August 17, 1964) is a Canadian blues rock singer and songwriter.

Biography

Early years
James was born in Regina, Saskatchewan, Canada.  His grandpa was Serbian. He got his break opening for Stevie Ray Vaughan in Regina in 1984.  When the scheduled opening act did not show, he only had a few hours' notice to put together a set of blues standards with members from the local Regina band "Flying Colours". Vaughan invited James to perform with him during the encore, and then join his tour as a permanent opening act. He and his band The Hoodoo Men opened for Vaughan for several tour dates in the United States. According to legend, Vaughan himself suggested the stage name "Colin James", because when announced over arena P.A. systems, "Munn" sounded like "Mud". James also played guitar on Richard Marx's song "Thunder and Lightning".

Rock, swing and blues career
In 1988, following his association with Vaughan, James released his self-titled debut album, which yielded several international hit singles, as did the follow up Sudden Stop. He presaged the mid-1990s swing music revival with his Colin James and the Little Big Band project, which released a successful first CD in 1993, with a follow-up gold record in 1998, a third disc 2006, and a Christmas album in 2007.

James's worldwide popularity waned somewhat in the late 1990s, but he continued to release albums in rock, blues, and acoustic styles. In 2005, he gave a command performance for Queen Elizabeth II during her visit to his home province of Saskatchewan.

James' backing band frequently includes members of the Vancouver-based band Odds, and he has co-written songs with Odds singer-guitarist Craig Northey. In February 2005, James guest-starred in an episode of the television program Corner Gas, a Canadian sitcom based in rural Saskatchewan.

In 2007, James' album Limelight received a Gold record for sales in Canada.  In January 2008, James received three Toronto Blues Society Maple Blues Awards: "Entertainer of the Year", "Electric Act of the Year" and "Recording of the Year" for Colin James & The Little Big Band 3.

In 2009, James recorded the album Rooftops and Satellites with, among others, former Junkhouse front man Tom Wilson. The album was co-produced, engineered and mixed by Mike Fraser, at The Warehouse Studio in Vancouver.

James' 2016 album Blue Highways spent 10 weeks at No.1 on the Roots Music Report's Blues Chart following its debut, and appeared in Living Blues magazine's Top 50 albums of that year. Its follow-up, Miles To Go, was released in September 2018, to equal acclaim entering the top 10 blues charts in Canada, USA, UK and Australia.

Personal life
James has been married to his wife Heather since 1989. They have two grown children and live in suburban Vancouver.

Discography

Studio albums 
 Colin James (1988)
 Sudden Stop (1990)
 Colin James and the Little Big Band (1993)
 Bad Habits (1995)
 National Steel (1997)
 Colin James and the Little Big Band II (1998)
 Fuse (2000)
 Traveler (2003)
 Limelight (2005)
 Colin James & The Little Big Band 3 (2006)
 Colin James & The Little Big Band: Christmas (2007)
 Rooftops and Satellites (2009)
 Fifteen (2012) 
 Hearts on Fire (2015)
 Blue Highways (2016)
 Miles to Go (2018)
 Open Road (2021)

Live albums
 Twenty Five Live (2013)

Compilation albums 
 Then Again... (1995)
 Take It From The Top: The Best Of Colin James (2011)

Guest appearances
 Long John Baldry – It Still Ain't Easy (1991)
 The Chieftains – Another Country (1992)
 Don Freed – Live, ARR! (1993; credited as Colin James Munn)
 Long John Baldry – Right To Sing The Blues (1996)
 JW-Jones Blues Band – My Kind of Evil (2004)
 Craig Northey and Jesse Valenzuela – Northey Valenzuela (2004)

Singles

Television appearance
James made a cameo in the Canadian television program Corner Gas, Season 2, episode 15, which was originally broadcast on February 21, 2005.

Juno Awards
James has been nominated for 17 Juno Awards, winning seven of them.

Wins
1989 – "Most Promising Male Vocalist of the Year"
1991 – "Single of the Year" for "Just Came Back"
1991 – "Male Vocalist of the Year"
1996 – "Male Vocalist of the Year"
1998 – "Best Blues Album for National Steel
1999 – "Best Producer" for "Let's Shout" and "C'mon with the C'mon" from Colin James and the Little Big Band II
2019 – "Blues Album of the Year" for "Miles to Go"

Nominations
1989 – "Canadian Entertainer of the Year"
1991 – "Canadian Entertainer of the Year"
1992 – "Canadian Entertainer of the Year"
1994 – "Best Blues/Gospel Album" for Colin James and The Little Big Band
1995 – "Male Vocalist of the Year"
1996 – "Best Video" for "Freedom"
1998 – "Best Male Vocalist"
1999 – "Best Blues Album for Colin James and The Little Big Band II
2007 – "Blues Album of the Year" for Colin James and The Little Big Band III
2013 – "Blues Album of the Year" for "Fifteen"
2017 – "Blues Album of the Year" for "Blue Highways"

Maple Blues Awards
Colin James has been nominated for, and won, 20 Maple Blues Awards, between 1997 and 2018

See also
Canadian blues
Canadian rock
Music of Canada

References

External links
 Official Website
 Colin James at AuthenticBlues.com
 Maple Blues Awards

1964 births
Living people
Canadian blues guitarists
Canadian male guitarists
Canadian blues singers
Canadian rock guitarists
Canadian rock singers
Canadian Quakers
Juno Award for Single of the Year winners
Musicians from Regina, Saskatchewan
Juno Award for Blues Album of the Year winners
Juno Award for Artist of the Year winners
Juno Award for Breakthrough Artist of the Year winners
Blues rock musicians
Swing revival musicians
20th-century Canadian guitarists
21st-century Canadian guitarists
Jack Richardson Producer of the Year Award winners
20th-century Canadian male singers
21st-century Canadian male singers